Fantastic Man is a 2007 Philippine television drama action fantasy series broadcast by GMA Network. The series is based on a 2003 Philippine film of the same title. Directed by Zoren Legaspi, it stars Mark Herras in the title role. It premiered on April 14, 2007. The series concluded on November 10, 2007, with a total of 31 episodes.

Cast and characters

Lead cast
Mark Herras as Fredo / Fantastic Man

Supporting cast
Ryza Cenon as Wena / Fantastic Girl
Joey Marquez as Manalo
Gloria Sevilla as Cedes
Miguel Tanfelix as Tikboy
Ariel Rivera as Danny / Tadtad
Patricia Ysmael
Jackie Rice as Helen
Beth Tamayo as Linda
Paolo Contis as Tisay
Benjie Paras as Gobo
Rez Cortez as Elvis
Pen Medina as Singkit
Keempee de Leon as Budol
Nicole Anderson as K
Ana Lea Javier as Faith
Patrick Garcia as Lloyd
Valerie Concepcion as Belle
Chuck Allie
Alvin Aragon
Jewel Mische as Vicky
Dion Ignacio as Dexter / Fire Man
Cristine Reyes as Kate / Screamer / Sylvia (special episode)
Ryan Yllana as Jopet / Lava Man
Arci Muñoz as Candy / Ice Candy
Rainier Castillo as Arman
Kevin Santos
Kirby de Jesus
Mike Tan as Bornok
Mart Escudero
Sherilyn Reyes as Elektrika
Maureen Larrazabal as Juliet
Jennylyn Mercado as Super S
 Nadine Samonte as Super T
Marco Alcaraz as Ivan
LJ Reyes as Binhi
Luis Alandy as Draxor
Jose Manalo and Wally Bayola as Super Dings
Paulo Avelino
Vivo Ouano
Bugz Daigo
Boy 2 Quizon as Cardo

Special episode
Mark Herras as Fredo/Fantastic Man
Ryza Cenon as Wena
Miguel Tanfelix as Tikboy
Joyce Jimenez

Villains
(in order of appearance in the TV series)

 Boss Elvis (played by Rez Cortez)
a trigger-happy syndicate leader
 Singkit (played by Pen Medina)
an entrepreneur whose Chinese restaurant is a front for his illegal business. He is involved in smuggling and drug trafficking. He uses chopsticks as his deadly weapons. Another special ability of Singkit is he can summon animal spirits.
 Budol (played by Keempee de Leon)
a con artist and an illegal dealer of counterfeit goods who uses hypnosis on his victims
 Madam Tisay (played by Paolo Contis)
is a loud club owner who uses witchcraft to get her way. Madam Tisay is involved in prostitution and white slavery, and employs a coven of witches as performers for her club.
 Gobo (played by Benjie Paras)
a circus freak with an unnatural strength and an impossibly feeble mind. Gobo is the leader of a pack of midget-thieves posing as circus performers. He can crush rocks with the use of his head, bend metal with his bare hands and does other extreme acts.
 Tadtad (played by Ariel Rivera)
the main antagonist of Fantastic Man in the first season. He is the head of a crime syndicate and who is really Fredo's father Danny. He is a master of disguise and uses it to hide the scars and burns of his face. He also has molten fire powers. He sacrifices his life to save his son from two alien invaders working for the warlord Draxor.
In season 2, a clone of his father who is being held in stasis by the P.S.I., a government agency, as a power source of their center.
 Kate (played by Cristine Reyes)
A high school cheerleader who was present at the time when almost everyone in her school disappeared after seeing the blinding light right above their campus. She later returned with the ability to let out a powerful screech, as well as being able to generate powerful gales and whirlwinds by doing so.
 Dexter (played by Dion Ignacio)
A high school basketball player and Kate's boyfriend from the same high school. After the mysterious disappearance, he returned with the power to combust objects by generating flames from his hands and channeling them at targets. With this power, he significantly weakened Fantastic Girl (Wena), forcing her to stay behind and replenish herself while Fantastic Man went after Dexter. Dexter's powers were later stripped away by a mysterious guy in a black robe.
 Jobet (played by Ryan Yllana)
A stuttering and obese high school nerd who was the subject of Dexter's constant bullying at high school prior to the students' mysterious disappearance. Upon returning, he exhibited the power to rapidly melt metal. His power seems to operate even via broadcast.
 Candy / Ice Candy (played by Arci Muñoz)
the best friend of Jobet. Another high school student who mysteriously disappeared and returned having the ability to manipulate cold and ice. This placed Fantastic Man at a heavy advantage against her. Powers later stripped away by the mysterious guy in a black robe.
 Arman (played by Rainier Castillo)
has healing powers, but can also revive the dead as mindless zombies whose allegiance is only for Arman himself
 Bornok (played by Mike Tan)
he has shape-shifting abilities which can copy another person flawlessly.
 Elektrika (played by Sherilyn Reyes)
she has electric powers.
 Super Dings (played by Jose and Wally)
A spoof villain of the superheroines, Super Twins.
 Draxor (played by Luis Alandy)
an alien warlord who has mind-controlling abilities and energy manipulation powers. He has come to Earth to gather all the powers accidentally absorbed by the various individuals in the series including the powers of Fantastic Man and Fantastic Girl. The mysterious guy in the black robe is his lackey who later betrays him by absorbing his powers as well as his life.
 Sylvia (played by Cristine Reyes)
 A woman from a Special Episode. She owns a Resort and is actually a Vampire.

Allies
 Professor Manalo (played by Joey Marquez)
Fredo's mentor, whose invention accidentally gave Fredo his remarkable abilities.
Super Twins (played by Jennelyn Mercado and Nadine Samonte)
guest starred for one episode to help out Fantastic Man on a case when he got injured and still feeling depressed from the death of Helen, Prof. Manalo's niece.
 Fantastic Girl (played by Ryza Cenon)
After inadvertently absorbing a seed of extraterrestrial origin, Wena gained the power to synchronize with flora, allowing her to manipulate plants to her liking, psionically generate them from her mind, and even communicate with them. Her primary weakness appears to be extreme heat and fire, in contrast to Fantastic Man's vulnerability to the cold.
 Lloyd Mendez (played by Patrick Garcia)
he has the clairvoyant power to locate others who disappeared and returned with unique abilities. He later gained the power to remove and steal powers from the alien Ivan. It is later revealed that Lloyd is secretly working for the alien Draxor.  He will betray both Draxor and Fantastic Man in his quest for ultimate power.
 Agent Belle (played by Valerie Concepcion)
top agent of the P.S.I. (Philippine Supernatural Investigation) and former student of Prof. Manalo.
 Ivan (played by Marco Alcaraz)
an alien who has come to Earth to remove the various powers from the students who acquired them. It is revealed he was the mysterious man in the black robe.  In his attempt to remove the various powers all at once, with the help of the P.S.I., he invented a machine to absorb the powers but this was sabotaged by Lloyd and the machine absorbed only his power instead. He is later killed by Lloyd to cover up his betrayal.
 Binhi (played by LJ Reyes)
an alien being who is the source of great power in the universe. The powers of both Fantastic Man and Fantastic Girl originated from her.
 Danny (played by Ariel Rivera)
A clone of Fredo's father. His power is that his body works like a nuclear reactor. Sacrificed his life to save his "son" from a liquid metal monster.
 Agent Vicki (played by Jewel Mische)
another P.S.I. agent who replaced Agent Belle in the series. Mind-controlled by Draxor to betray Fantastic Man and his team. Later killed by Draxor while trying to free the imprisoned Binhi.
 Agent Juliet (played by Maureen Larazabal)
another P.S.I. agent who replaced Agent Vicki upon her defection.

Accolades

References

External links
 

2007 Philippine television series debuts
2007 Philippine television series endings
Fantaserye and telefantasya
Filipino-language television shows
GMA Network drama series
Philippine action television series
Television shows set in the Philippines